Maxville is a former town on U.S. Route 66, approximately two miles (3 km) east of Carthage in Jasper County, Missouri, United States. The community is part of the Joplin, Missouri Metropolitan Statistical Area.

References

Former populated places in Jasper County, Missouri
Joplin, Missouri, metropolitan area
Former populated places in Missouri